Dehferi District is a district (bakhsh) in Fereydunkenar County, Mazandaran Province, Iran. At the 2006 census, its population was 17,097, in 4,494 families.  The District has no cities.  The District has one rural district (dehestan): Emamzadeh Abdollah Rural District.

References 

Fereydunkenar County
Districts of Mazandaran Province